The Byker Viaduct (also known as the Byker Metro Bridge) is a  curved 'S' shaped light railway bridge, which carries the Tyne and Wear Metro over the River Ouseburn in Newcastle upon Tyne. It carries the line from Manors Metro station in the city centre to the west, to Byker Metro station in the area of Byker to the east, over the lower Ouseburn valley, with the river emptying into the north side of the River Tyne, to the south.

It was notable, in being the first such structure in Britain to be built using cantilevered concrete sections with joints glued with epoxy resin.

It was one of two major bridges built specifically for the Tyne and Wear Metro, the other being the Queen Elizabeth II Bridge crossing the River Tyne.

It is one of three high level bridges in close proximity making the same crossing, with the Ouseburn railway viaduct to the north and the Byker road bridge to the south. The bridge and elevated section form an S-curve, which takes the track over the Byker road bridge at its east end.

References

External links

Constructing the Byker Viaduct. North East Film Archive - Contemporary film of the construction.

Railway bridges in Tyne and Wear
Tyne and Wear Metro
Bridges completed in 1979
Buildings and structures in Newcastle upon Tyne